Dziekanów Leśny  (German Deutsch Dziekanow) is a village in the administrative district of Gmina Łomianki, within Warsaw West County, Masovian Voivodeship, in east-central Poland.

The village has a population of 1,400.

References

Villages in Warsaw West County